José Roberto da Silva Júnior (born 6 July 1974), commonly known as Zé Roberto, is a Brazilian former professional footballer who played as a left wing-back or as a midfielder. Currently, he is a technical advisor to Palmeiras, acting directly with the players and the coaching staff.

Club career

Early career
Zé Roberto started in the youth ranks of Palestra de São Bernardo but it was while playing for Portuguesa, as a left-back, that he became known throughout Brazil after finishing as runner-up in 1996 Campeonato Brasileiro Série A.

He then joined Real Madrid in January 1997 for a brief spell, where he helped them win the 1996–97 Spanish league championship. He was also part of the Madrid's 1997–98 UEFA Champions League winning squad, scoring his only goal for the club in the opening group match against Rosenborg BK, before moving back to Brazil to play for Flamengo midway through the season. In an interview in 2012, Zé Roberto spoke of his decision to leave Madrid because of his ambition to play for Brazil at the 1998 FIFA World Cup in France and had limited opportunities to prove his talents in Spain.

The first half of 1998 Zé played for Flamengo under manager Paulo Autuori alongside Romário, Palinha, Juan (who would later play for Leverkusen and AS Roma), and his former Portuguesa teammate Rodrigo Fabri for the Rio de Janeiro State Championship, finishing disappointingly as runners-up. After this he was signed by German Bundesliga club Bayer 04 Leverkusen.

Bayer Leverkusen
He joined Bayer Leverkusen in the summer of 1998. It was at Leverkusen that he really made a name for himself, quickly becoming a popular figure at the club. During his four-year stay, Bayer enjoyed their most successful period, finishing as runners-up in the German Bundesliga on three occasions.

On 4 December 2001, he opened the scoring with a curling free kick against Deportivo de La Coruña in the 64th minute, as Bayer comprehensively beat the Spanish side 3–0 in the second group stage of the Champions League. Following Bayer's victory over Liverpool in the quarter-finals of the Champions League on 9 April 2002, Zé Roberto announced that he would be joining former teammate Michael Ballack at Bayern Munich. Despite the transfer distractions, Zé Roberto helped Bayer reach the final of the Champions League on 15 May 2002, losing 2–1 to former club Real Madrid in Glasgow. In four years at the club, Zé Roberto appeared in 113 league matches scoring 16 goals.

Bayern Munich and Santos

In May 2002, he joined Bayern Munich for a reported fee of €12 million, signing a three-year deal, linking up with emerging German talent Sebastian Deisler and former Leverkusen teammate Michael Ballack. With Bayern he claimed the domestic league and cup double three times between 2002 and 2006. He found his starting spot threatened under new coach Felix Magath and left the club in 2006. Following the announcement that he would not return to Bayern Munich, he publicly criticized the club's style of play and predicted struggles if changes were not made.

Being a free agent Zé Roberto signed through his agent Juan Figer a three year contract with Club Nacional de Football in Montevideo, a club he would never play for.  On 31 August 2006 it was announced that he would join Santos FC in Brazil for one year. and helped the team to win the 2007 Campeonato Paulista. The win was his first title in a Brazilian competition. He scored seven goals in the 2007 Copa Libertadores, where Santos reached the semi-finals.
During his time with Santos he appeared in 48 official matches scoring 12 goals, playing for the first time in his career as an attacking midfielder.

On 22 June 2007 it was announced, that he will return to Bayern Munich, which paid on million euro to Nacional for a two year loan.

He stated, "It was as if I’d never been away", en route to winning a fourth domestic double with the Bavarians. During Bayern's 2007–08 season, he scored five goals and was influential in Bayern's domestic and cup double. The revitalised Zé Roberto demonstrated all his newly acquired skills by scoring five goals and forming a rock-solid partnership with Mark van Bommel in his new role in central defensive midfield.

He made a successful start to the 2008–09 season – scoring four goals in his first 11 starts. He would conclude his second spell at the Bavarian club appearing in 59 league matches scoring nine goals.

Zé Roberto left the club at the end of the 2009 season after Bayern executives refused to offer him a new two-year deal.

Hamburger SV

His contract with Bayern ran until 30 June 2009. The club offered him a contract until 2010, though Zé Roberto declined. Bundesliga side Hamburger SV officially announced signing Zé Roberto to a two-year contract on 2 July 2009. But Der Spiegel reported Hamburg actually paid €4 million sign-on fees to Zé Roberto's agent Juan Figer, which Bayern also paid €1 million in 2007. In May 2011, Zé Roberto confirmed that he would not renew his contract with the German team, because he wanted a longer contract than the new one offered by the club.

Al-Gharafa 
On 10 July 2011, Zé Roberto signed a two-year contract with the Qatari club Al-Gharafa, where he helped his team win the 2012 Emir of Qatar Cup.

Return to Brazil
After a season with Qatari outfit Al-Gharafa, Zé Roberto returned to Brazil in May to join Grêmio, helping them finish third in the Campeonato Brasileiro Série A. On 10 December 2012, he expressed his desire to retire at Grêmio after extending his contract by a further year.

On 9 December 2014, Zé Roberto left Grêmio as the club decided not to renew his contract.

Palmeiras

On 22 December 2014, Zé Roberto joined Palmeiras on a one-year contract, valid until 31 December 2015. He was immediately appointed team captain, helping them win the 2015 Copa do Brasil with four goals scored in the competition. In the Campeonato Brasileiro Série A, Palmeiras finished in the 9th position. He signed a one-year extension to his contract on 19 October 2015, that will keep him in the squad until 31 December 2016. On 28 November 2016, he won his first national championship in Brazil, declaring after the final match against Chapecoense that he would not retire at the end of the season. Eventually, on 9 December, he signed a new contract with Palmeiras, keeping him at the club until the end of 2017. On 24 November, he announced Palmeiras match against Botafogo two days later would be the last of his career and that he would retire.

International career
Zé Roberto was part of the Brazil squads at the 1998 and 2006 World Cups. In 1998, he helped the Seleção to the final, making one appearance, but was an unused substitute as Brazil lost to hosts France 3–0. He was left out of the 2002 World Cup winning squad due to a calf injury. Zé Roberto scored Brazil's third and final goal in a man of the match performance in Brazil's second round match against Ghana in the 2006 World Cup finals in Germany.

Zé Roberto helped Brazil to wins at the 1997 and 1999 editions of the Copa América, scoring Brazil's third goal in their 3–1 defeat of Bolivia in the final on 26 June 1997.

He also represented Brazil at the 1997 and 2005 FIFA Confederations Cups in Saudi Arabia and Germany respectively, winning both. He played the full ninety minutes of the final in 2005, as Brazil overpowered arch rivals Argentina 4–1 on 29 June 2005.

Style of play

Capable of playing both as a left-sided defender, and in several midfield positions, Zé Roberto was a quick, hard-working, and versatile left-footed player, who in his prime was known for his technique, vision, and efficient style of play, as well as his dribbling, passing, crossing, and tackling ability. He started his career as an attacking full-back or wing back on the left flank, occasionally functioning in a box-to-box role in midfield; he was later deployed as a left-winger, and subsequently in a more creative role, as an attacking midfielder, although he struggled to find space in the national side in this position, due to the presence of several other world-class playmakers in the squad. During his time at Bayern Munich, he excelled alongside van Bommel as a defensive midfielder, due to his ability to read the game, break down opposing plays, and subsequently start counter-attacks; his adeptness at this new holding role led him to be called up to the Brazil national team once again, where he also formed an effective and consistent defensive midfield partnership with Emerson.

Personal life
Zé Roberto is married to Luciana, with whom he has three children: Endrik, Miriá, and Isabelli.

Zé Roberto is a Christian. He said, "Aside from the fame, the money, from not being able to have anything and today being able to have everything, I find that the difference is to have God in my heart, by accepting Jesus. The money will finish, fame will be forgotten, but God is special. Today I have God and tomorrow I will live with God in a much better place, that is, heaven."

Career statistics
Sources:

Club

International
Appearances and goals by national team and year

International goals
Scores and results list Brazil's goal tally first.

Honours
Real Madrid
La Liga: 1996–97
Supercopa de España: 1997

Bayern Munich
Bundesliga: 2002–03, 2004–05, 2005–06, 2007–08
DFB-Pokal: 2002–03, 2004–05, 2005–06, 2007–08
DFL-Ligapokal: 2004, 2007

Santos
Campeonato Paulista: 2007

Al-Gharafa
Emir of Qatar Cup: 2012

Palmeiras
Copa do Brasil: 2015
Campeonato Brasileiro Série A: 2016
Brazil
 Copa América: 1997, 1999
 FIFA Confederations Cup: 1997, 2005
 Lunar New Year Cup: 2005
Individual
 kicker Bundesliga Team of the Season: 1999–2000, 2001–02, 2007–08
 FIFA World Cup All-Star Team: 2006
 Bola de Prata: 2012, 2014
 Campeonato Paulista Team of the year: 2015
 Goal of the Year in the Brasileirão: 2016

See also 
 List of men's footballers with the most official appearances

References

External links

 
 Zé Roberto profile at Leverkusen.com
 
 Tom Sanderson: How Zé Roberto defied time to remain a star at 43, These Football Times, 24 July 2017

1974 births
Living people
Campeonato Brasileiro Série A players
Associação Portuguesa de Desportos players
Bayer 04 Leverkusen players
FC Bayern Munich footballers
Hamburger SV players
Brazilian footballers
Expatriate footballers in Spain
Expatriate footballers in Germany
Expatriate footballers in Qatar
Brazilian expatriate footballers
La Liga players
Real Madrid CF players
CR Flamengo footballers
Santos FC players
Grêmio Foot-Ball Porto Alegrense players
Sociedade Esportiva Palmeiras players
Footballers from São Paulo (state)
1996 CONCACAF Gold Cup players
1997 Copa América players
1997 FIFA Confederations Cup players
1998 FIFA World Cup players
1999 Copa América players
1999 FIFA Confederations Cup players
2005 FIFA Confederations Cup players
2006 FIFA World Cup players
Copa América-winning players
FIFA Confederations Cup-winning players
Brazil international footballers
Bundesliga players
Al-Gharafa SC players
Qatar Stars League players
Brazilian expatriate sportspeople in Spain
Brazilian expatriate sportspeople in Germany
Brazilian expatriate sportspeople in Qatar
UEFA Champions League winning players
Association football fullbacks
Association football midfielders
Brazilian Christians